Paenisporosarcina quisquiliarum is a bacterium from the genus of Paenisporosarcina.

References

External links
Type strain of Paenisporosarcina quisquiliarum at BacDive -  the Bacterial Diversity Metadatabase

Bacillales
Bacteria described in 2009